Sean Guthrie (born April 18, 1988) is an American racing driver from Albuquerque, New Mexico. The son of former IndyCar Series driver Jim Guthrie, he is a former Firestone Indy Lights driver and currently competes part-time in the NASCAR K&N Pro Series West.

Career 

Guthrie began his karting career at the age of eight. He won an IKF championship in 2002 and the SKUSA Long Track Nationals in 2003 and moved up to cars in SCCA Formula Ford in 2004. In 2005 he moved up to the Star Mazda Series and finished 14th in points in a season beset by mechanical problems. The team, owned by his father, decided to move up to the Indy Pro Series in 2006, but Sean was forced to miss the first three races of the season as he was not yet the league-mandated 18 years old. He competed in 5 races with a best finish of 5th at Kentucky Speedway. The team returned for 2007 for a full season. After crashing out of the first three races of the season, the team regrouped and finished the Freedom 100 and Sean registered a career-best 4th-place finish at the Milwaukee Mile a week later.  In the Iowa Speedway race Sean suffered a heavy crash and the team's car had to be sent back to the manufacturer Dallara in Italy for repairs. Sean injured both his foot and knee in the accident.  Sean made three starts at the end of the season for Playa Del Racing as the team ran in cooperation with Guthrie.  Until his suspension in April 2009, he drove for his father's team Guthrie Racing along with teammates Alistair Jackson and Jesse Mason. Sean finished 14th in the 2007 championship and returned to the series, now called the Firestone Indy Lights Series in 2008, finishing 10th in points. In April 2009 he was suspended from the Indy Racing League after the race at Kansas Speedway in which he was penalized for driving through an accident zone too quickly and passing a car under the yellow flag and then refused to respond to the black flag. He made his return to the Firestone Indy Lights Series on October 9, 2009 at Homestead with Andersen Racing. After participating in dirt track racing throughout 2010, Guthrie again returned to Indy Lights for the season finale at Homestead with Andersen, finishing 10th.

After driving in drifting for the 2011 season, Guthrie returned to professional motorsports in 2012, driving in the NASCAR K&N Pro Series West at Sandia Motor Speedway in late September, finishing 22nd and last in his debut in the series.

Indy Lights

References

External links
 
 

Living people
1988 births
Racing drivers from Albuquerque, New Mexico
Indy Lights drivers
Indy Pro 2000 Championship drivers
NASCAR drivers
Drifting drivers
International Kart Federation drivers
Rahal Letterman Lanigan Racing drivers